The long-snouted pipefish, Stigmatopora macropterygia, is a pipefish of the family Syngnathidae, found around New Zealand including the Auckland Islands, at depths of a few metres.

See also
 Longsnout pipefish, Leptonotus norae

References

Syngnathidae
Endemic marine fish of New Zealand
Ovoviviparous fish
Fish described in 1870
Taxa named by Auguste Duméril